General Sir Walter Pipon Braithwaite,  (11 November 1865 – 7 September 1945) was a British Army officer who held senior commands during the First World War. After being dismissed from his position as Chief of Staff for the Mediterranean Expeditionary Force, he received some acclaim as a competent divisional commander on the Western Front. After the war, he was commissioned to produce a report analysing the performance of British staff officers during the conflict.

Early life
Braithwaite was born in Alne, the son of the Reverend William Braithwaite and Laura Elizabeth Pipon. He was the youngest of twelve children. He was educated at Victoria College between 1875 and 1880, and at Bedford School between 1880 and 1884.

Military career

Braithwaite studied at the Royal Military College, Sandhurst, and was commissioned as a lieutenant in the Somerset Light Infantry on 3 January 1886. He was promoted to captain on 8 November 1894. He served in the Second Boer War, seeing action at Ladysmith, Spion Kop, Vaal Krantz and Tugela Heights. He was mentioned in despatches three times and in a South Africa honours list received the brevet rank of major on 29 November 1900. Staying in South Africa until the war ended, he only returned to the United Kingdom on the SS Briton three months later in September 1902. After his return he was on in early October posted to Southern Command as a deputy assistant quartermaster-general on the staff of Sir Evelyn Wood, General Officer in Command of the 2nd Army Corps. In 1906, Braithwaite was promoted to major, and transferred to The Loyal North Lancashire Regiment. He was later promoted to lieutenant colonel, and served as an instructor at the Staff College, Camberley. In 1909, he was assigned to the staff of Douglas Haig at the War Office, and promoted to colonel. He was subsequently named commandant of the Staff College, Quetta, a position he still held at the outbreak of the First World War. At this point, the college was closed, and he was again transferred to the War Office, this time as Director of Staff Duties.

First World War
In 1915, during the First World War, he was appointed Chief of Staff for the Mediterranean Expedition, commanded by Ian Hamilton. He was regarded by many of the Australians involved in that effort as "arrogant and incompetent". After the failure of the Mediterranean expedition, Braithwaite was recalled to London. He was later assigned to command of the 62nd (2nd West Riding) Division, a Territorial Force (TF) formation, which was posted to France in January 1917. Here he experienced considerable success. Although the division struggled to make headway during the Battle of Arras, it proved a solid and reliable unit during the German spring offensive the following year. Following success in repelling German advances at Bullecourt and Cambrai, he was given command of IX Corps on 13 September 1918 and later XII Corps.

On 29 September 1918 Braithwaite's IX Corps was on the southern front line at the village of Bellenglise facing the canal, when the order came from Haig to attack through the Hindenburg Line. The assault was much more successful than earlier American and Australian efforts, encountering as they did, multiple gas attacks. The spearhead was led by the 46th (North Midland) Division. As Major H. J. C. Marshall, a divisional staff officer, recorded they were not expected to advance far, leaving that to the Americans and Australians to their left. If they could not get a foothold they were had orders to swim across the canal in ice cold water. But divisional HQ had spared no effort to find all necessary equipment to achieve the objective. They advanced one hour later than the Americans under a hail of machine gun bullets and "cyclone of shells". A thick fog came down helping to mask them from German sight. Pushing on through the dawn's early light, a battalion of the North Staffordshire Regiment overran the German machine gun positions; the bridge's defenders were shot and killed, as the infantry fixed bayonets and charged. 5,000 German prisoners of war (POWs) were taken. For almost the first time in the war the attack had been an outstanding success. Brathwaite received plaudits from Monash and Rawlinson. The 46th Division recovered over 1,000 machine guns. Weeks later King George V visited Bellenglise, the site where the Hindenburg Line was breached by a Territorial unit.

Braithwaite was devastated by his son's death on 1 July 1916, the first day of the Battle of the Somme. Having no heir, he burnt all his family papers. As successes emerged in late 1918, Field Marshal Sir Douglas Haig, Commander-in-Chief (C-in-C) of the British Expeditionary Force (BEF) on the Western Front, was effusive in praise of his officer's and men's achievement, showing the friendship and esteem for which he was held by General Braithwaite all his life.

Post war
After the war, Braithwaite was commissioned by Haig to produce a report evaluating the performance of British staff officers in all theatres of the conflict. Although the decision-making abilities of many staff officers (including Braithwaite) had been seriously questioned during the war, Braithwaite's report was generally favourable.

He became General Officer Commanding-in-Chief Western Command, India in 1920, General Officer Commanding-in-Chief at Scottish Command in 1923, and then General Officer Commanding-in Chief at Eastern Command in 1926 before being appointed Adjutant-General to the Forces in 1927. In 1928 he was in charge of arranging Douglas Haig's funeral. He retired in 1931.

He served as a commissioner of the Commonwealth War Graves Commission from 1927 to 1931, as Governor of the Royal Hospital Chelsea from 1931 to 1938, and as King of Arms of the Order of the Bath from 1933 until his death.

He died at his home in Rotherwick on 7 September 1945.

Family
Braithwaite married in 1895 Jessie Ashworth, with whom he had a son, Valentine. Captain Valentine Braithwaite MC was killed in action at Serre while serving with his father's former regiment, the Somerset Light Infantry, on 1 July 1916 aged 20.

Notes

Bibliography

Sir John Edmonds and R Maxwell-Hyslop (eds.) Military Operations France and Belgium 1918, volume V, London, HMSO, 1947

External links

Walter Braithwaite at Western Front Association
Walter Braithwaite at First World War.com
Walter Braithwaite at the Western Front Association
Walter Braithwaite at the Birmingham Centre for First World War studies
Walter Braithwaite at This is Jersey.com

|-

|-

|-

|-

|-

|-

|-

|-

British Army generals
Somerset Light Infantry officers
British Army generals of World War I
Knights Grand Cross of the Order of the Bath
British Army personnel of the Second Boer War
People educated at Victoria College, Jersey
People educated at Bedford School
Graduates of the Royal Military College, Sandhurst
1865 births
1945 deaths
People from Hambleton District
Loyal Regiment officers
Commandants of the Staff College, Quetta
Academics of the Staff College, Camberley
Military personnel from Yorkshire